Faith Michael (née Ikidi; born 28 February 1987) is a Nigerian footballer who plays as a defender for Damallsvenskan club Piteå IF and the Nigeria women's national team.

Early life
Born in Port Harcourt, Ikidi was raised in Edo State.

Club career
In 2006, Ikidi was one of three Nigerian players to be the first set of Africans to play in the Swedish Championship while playing for QBIK.

In December 2015, Ikidi signed a two-year extension with Piteå.

International career
Ikiri has represented Nigeria on the senior national team since 2004. In November 2006, she helped the team win its fifth African Women's Championship after defeating Ghana 1–0.

Honors and awards

International
Nigeria
 Africa Women Cup of Nations Winner: 2006, 2016, 2018

Team
with Linköping FC
 Damallsvenskan: 2009
 Super Cup Women: 2010
Individual
 Damallsvenskan Defender of the Year: 2015
Team
with Piteå
 Damallsvenskan: 2018

Personal life
Ikidi married husband Nick Michael on 12 December 2015.

References

External links

 
 Piteå profile 
 Linkoping profile

1987 births
Living people
Sportspeople from Port Harcourt
Nigerian women's footballers
Women's association football defenders
Klepp IL players
QBIK players
Eskilstuna United DFF players
Linköpings FC players
Piteå IF (women) players
Damallsvenskan players
Olympic footballers of Nigeria
Nigeria women's international footballers
2003 FIFA Women's World Cup players
Footballers at the 2004 Summer Olympics
2007 FIFA Women's World Cup players
Footballers at the 2008 Summer Olympics
2011 FIFA Women's World Cup players
2019 FIFA Women's World Cup players
Nigerian expatriate women's footballers
Nigerian expatriate sportspeople in Norway
Nigerian expatriate sportspeople in Sweden
Expatriate women's footballers in Norway
Expatriate women's footballers in Sweden
Bayelsa Queens F.C. players